The Mallick (Hasani Qadiriyya), Malik baya) are small Sayyid Muslim community found in the state of Bihar in India and follow Sunni Islam.  According to Bihar Minority commission report and several other historical books they are considered to be an ashraf community  among Bihari Muslims which means that they have high social status. They are mainly concentrated around Nalanda and Bihar Sharif.

History
They are the descendants of Syed Ibrahim Mallick baya and family according to the government data of bihar Sharif and ancient books, a Sufi born near Ghazni (Afghanistan), descended from ancestors who had migrated there from Baghdad. The Muslim population of Bihar was around 13% before the partition of India in 1947. At that time "Syed Mallick Baya Families" constituted about 15% of the Muslim population of Bihar.

See also
 Bihari Muslims
 Bihar Sharif
 Syed Ibrahim Mallick Baya

References 

Muslim communities of India
Social groups of India
Social groups of Bihar
Muslim communities of Bihar